Legion: The Legend of Excalibur is a real-time strategy / action role-playing video game hybrid developed by the ex-Westwood Studios 7 Studios and published by Midway Games for the PlayStation 2 in 2002. The game tells the story of the young King Arthur to save the kingdom from the evil sorceress Morgan and was given mostly poor or mediocre reviews by critics.

Gameplay

Plot
Legion: The Legend of Excalibur begins with the dark sorceress Queen Morgan le Fay attacking and slaying her father Uther Pendragon to take over the Kingdom of Camelot. Her good young half-brother King Arthur claims the right to the throne by pulling the magic sword Excalibur out of the stone and sets off to gather the forces of good (including the warrior Lady Gwenevere, the wizard Merlin, the sorceress Nimue, and the knights Sir Lancelot, Sir Percival and Sir Galahad), defeat Morgan's supernatural armies (led by the Red Knight, the Green Knight, and the Black Knight, and King Lot), and eventually to avenge his father.

Reception

Legion: The Legend of Excalibur was met with generally mixed or average critical reception, including the averaged scores of 51/100 at Metacritic and 57.89% at GameRankings. Chris Carle of IGN gave it a positive review and a score 7.8/10, stating that "nothing like Legion currently exists on the PlayStation 2" to be such a mix of genres, and opining that "in the end, Legion is a solid game that is worth playing through once. It may lose its steam after that, but it's a fun mix of action, strategy and RPG. Fans of Gauntlet, Baldur's Gate: Dark Alliance and Diablo might want to give it a look." On the other hand, Jeff Gerstmann of GameSpot gave it only 3.8/10, opining "Legion has many sound concepts, but just about everything falls apart in the execution, resulting in a game that runs the gamut from frustrating to just plain terrible." Other reviews included C− from Game Revolution, 3/10 from RPGamer, 3/10 from PlayStation World, 6.7/10 from GameZone, 9/20 from JeuxVideo.com (France), and 66% from 4Players (Germany).

References

External links
Official website
Legion: The Legend of Excalibur at MobyGames
Legion: The Legend of Excalibur at GameFAQs

2002 video games
Action role-playing video games
Fantasy video games set in the Middle Ages
PlayStation 2-only games
PlayStation 2 games
Real-time strategy video games
Single-player video games
Video games based on Arthurian legend
Video games developed in the United States
Video games set in the Middle Ages
Video games about witchcraft
7 Studios games